Damage is a Ugandan drama feature film created, written and directed by Denis Dhikusooka Jr. The film is a production of PEARL Wonders Entertainment and stars Doreen Rwatooro and Rodney Dhikusooka in the lead roles.

Plot
Martin, (Rodney Dhikusooka), a nice looking young man and a student of Makerere University chooses to play girls for sport. He takes pleasure in messing with them and using them for his amusement. From the humble and innocent type like Kim, (Sharon Mutetsi) to the very stubborn and jumpy type like Jackie, (Fortunate Tumukunde) and Eve, (Flavia Gold Kaitetsi). The tables are turned around when he lands this beautiful young girl, Nicole, (Doreen Rwatooro) and he falls in love.  Since he doesn't believe in true love, Martin loses out on her when it only gets clear to him that he deeply cares for her and by the time this happens, Nicole is implicated in a crime that he very well led to. Now the love of his life has to serve a life sentence as he stays in regret and grief.

See also
 Bala Bala Sese
 The Life (2012 film)

References

External links
 

2016 films
Films shot in Uganda
Films set in Uganda
Films about music and musicians
2016 drama films
Films about drugs
2010s English-language films
English-language Ugandan films
Ugandan drama films